Roger Federer was the defending champion, but withdrew due to fatigue.

Tomáš Berdych won in the final 7–5, 6–4, against Marcos Baghdatis.

Seeds

Draw

Finals

Top half

Bottom half

External links
Association of Tennis Professionals (ATP) singles Draw
Association of Tennis Professionals (ATP) qualifying draw

Singles